Muideen Akanji (born May 12, 1992) is a Nigerian boxer who competes as a middleweight. At the 2012 Summer Olympics he was defeated in the heats of the Men's middleweight by Darren O'Neill.

References

Living people
Sportspeople from Lagos
Olympic boxers of Nigeria
Boxers at the 2012 Summer Olympics
Middleweight boxers
Boxers at the 2010 Summer Youth Olympics
1992 births
Yoruba sportspeople
Nigerian male boxers
African Games bronze medalists for Nigeria
African Games medalists in boxing
Competitors at the 2011 All-Africa Games